Ilka Štuhec (born 26 October 1990) is a Slovenian World Cup alpine ski racer, focusing on the speed events of downhill and super-G. She was a three-time junior world champion in three different disciplines, and was the world champion in downhill in 2017 and 2019.

Career
At the 2007 World Junior Alpine Skiing Championships in Flachau, Austria, Štuhec won two gold medals in slalom and combined. The following year, she won another gold in downhill in Formigal, Spain. She made her World Cup debut in March 2007 at the age of 16 in Lenzerheide, Switzerland.

Štuhec gained her first World Cup victories in December 2016, back-to-back wins in downhill at Lake Louise. She had consecutive wins two weeks later in Val d'Isère, France, and won her fifth event of the 2017 season in late January in Italy. At the 2017 World Championships in February, she won the gold medal in downhill, and clinched the World Cup season title in combined two weeks later. At the finals in mid-March she secured another title in downhill, and was the runner-up for the season in super-G and overall.

In October 2017, an injury to her left knee (ACL) kept Štuhec out of the entire season, including the 2018 Winter Olympics in South Korea. She returned to the winner's circle with consecutive World Cup victories in Val Gardena in December 2018, and successfully defended her World Championships title in downhill in February 2019. Two weeks later, a crash at Crans-Montana injured the same knee (PCL); it was reported that she would recover without surgery.

World Cup results

Season titles
 2 titles – (1 combined, 1 downhill)

Season standings

Race victories
 11 wins – (7 DH, 3 SG, 1 AC)

World Championship results

Olympic Games results

References

External links
 

1990 births
Living people
Sportspeople from Slovenj Gradec
Slovenian female alpine skiers
Alpine skiers at the 2014 Winter Olympics
Alpine skiers at the 2022 Winter Olympics
Olympic alpine skiers of Slovenia